Nyanga-li (Linyanga-le) is a Bantu language in Orientale Province, Democratic Republic of the Congo.  Gbati-ri (Gbote) is a dialect.  Maho (2009) lists them separately as unclassified Zone D.30 languages, but Ethnologue states that they are "members of the same dialect subgroup", and Glottolog places them nearest the Ngendan languages.

References

Bantu languages
Languages of the Democratic Republic of the Congo